Oxybasis glauca (syn. Chenopodium glaucum), common name oak-leaved goosefoot, is a species of goosefoot plant native to Europe. It has been introduced and become an invasive weed in North America. This invader of European origin also appears in trampled communities in North Korea.

Gallery

References

Gelin Zhu, Sergei L. Mosyakin & Steven E. Clemants: Chenopodiaceae in der Flora of China, Volume 5, S. 379: Chenopodium glaucum - Online. (Beschrijving en systematiek)
Steven E. Clemants & Sergei L. Mosyakin: Chenopodium in der Flora of North America, Volume 4, S. 283: Chenopodium glaucum - Online. (Beschrijving en systematiek)
 Werner Rothmaler: Exkursionsflora von Deutschland, Band 4 Kritischer Band, Volk und Wissen, Berlin 1990.

External links
Chenopodium glaucum info
Oak-leaved goosefoot

Chenopodioideae
Plants described in 1753
Taxa named by Carl Linnaeus